"Cruisin'", also known as "Lucy and Ramona and Sunset Sam", is the last single to be released by Michael Nesmith as a solo artist. The song was released in 1979 under Pacific Arts (PAC 108) from the album Infinite Rider on the Big Dogma. The B-side of the single was "Carioca". "Cruisin'" tells the story of three individuals who live on the streets of Los Angeles, California and are related by their lifestyle.

Background
A promotional video was made for Cruisin''' and was released on Nesmith's Elephant Parts''. Contrary to popular belief, the video did not debut Hulk Hogan, but rather, featured wrestler Steve Strong who resembles a young Hulk Hogan. Nesmith mistakenly stated in 1989 that Hogan played the role, but he corrected his statement in 2003.

The song received considerable airplay on AOR rock stations during the summer of 1979. Cleveland AOR station WMMS music director Denny Sanders had the song in "high rotation" during the months of July and August. Although it did not chart in the US, it peaked at No. 6 on the New Zealand singles chart.

The Original Spanish Kitchen appears briefly in the background of the video for the song. It is in a five-second vignette which accompanies the words, "passing up the treats from a Kid named Cisco", in the second verse of the song.

Charts

Personnel
 Michael Nesmith – guitar, producer, vocals
 Lenny Castro – percussion
 Joe Chemay – arranger, background vocals
 John Hobbs – keyboards, background vocals
 Paul Laim – drums
 David MacKay – bass guitar
 Al Perkins – guitar
 Tom Saviano – saxophone

References

1979 singles
Songs written by Michael Nesmith
Songs about Los Angeles
1979 songs